Arturo S. Huerta (born 30 March 1964 in Toronto) is a Canadian retired athlete who specialised in race walking. He represented his country at two Summer Olympics, in 1996 and 2000, as well as two World Championships. In addition, he won the silver medal at the 1998 Commonwealth Games.

He has personal bests of 1:21:03 in 20 kilometres walk (Toronto 2000) and 3:58:02 in the 50 kilometres walk (Poza Rica 2000).

Competition record

References

1964 births
Living people
Athletes from Toronto
Canadian male racewalkers
Athletes (track and field) at the 1996 Summer Olympics
Athletes (track and field) at the 2000 Summer Olympics
Olympic track and field athletes of Canada
Athletes (track and field) at the 1998 Commonwealth Games
Commonwealth Games medallists in athletics
Commonwealth Games silver medallists for Canada
Athletes (track and field) at the 1999 Pan American Games
Pan American Games track and field athletes for Canada
Medallists at the 1998 Commonwealth Games